Mathieu Criquielion (born 27 April 1981 in Ath) is a Belgian former cyclist. His father Claude was also a professional cyclist.

Major results
2004
 1st Stage 1 Tour du Brabant Wallon
2006
 10th Omloop van het Waasland

References

1981 births
Living people
Belgian male cyclists
People from Ath
Cyclists from Hainaut (province)